Msanzala District is a district of Eastern Province, Zambia. It is also known as Lusangazi District and was made independent from Petauke District in 2018.

References 

Districts of Eastern Province, Zambia